Năm Căn is a commune-level town (Thị trấn) and capital town of Năm Căn District, Cà Mau Province, in Vietnam. Nam Can is 50 km south of Cà Mau City, the provincial capital. The town is located on the river. Vinashin has a shipbuilding factory here. An oil refinery is considered to be built here by an American company.

Populated places in Cà Mau province
Communes of Cà Mau province
District capitals in Vietnam
Townships in Vietnam